Aye Cho (born 5 July 1957) is a Burmese politician who currently serves as an Amyotha Hluttaw MP for Bago Region No.9 Constituency. He is a member of the National League for Democracy.

Political career
He is a member of the National League for Democracy. In the 2015 Myanmar general election, he was elected as an Amyotha Hluttaw MP and elected representative from Bago Region No. 9 parliamentary constituency. He also serves as a member of Amyotha Hluttaw Education Promotion Committee.

References

National League for Democracy politicians
1957 births
Living people
People from Bago Region